Lachlan McLean (born 28 March 1996) is an Australian former soccer player who played as a forward.

Career

College
McLean began his collegiate career in 2016, coming to the United States to pursue a professional career after failing to secure a spot with an A-League team. He attended Southern Illinois University Edwardsville, and played for four years with the men's soccer program, earning Missouri Valley Conference All-Freshman team honors in his first season and Academic All-Mid-American Conference honors in his senior year.

Greenville Triumph
In February 2020, McLean was signed by the Greenville Triumph of USL League One, joining alongside defenders Cesar Murillo and Trevor Swartz. He made his debut for the club on 18 July 2020, coming on as an 83rd-minute substitute for Noah Pilato in a 2–0 victory over Fort Lauderdale CF.

Northern Colorado Hailstorm
On 17 December 2021, it was announced that McLean would join USL League One side Northern Colorado Hailstorm ahead of their inaugural season. Following the 2022 season, Northern Colorado declined his contract option. On 14 January 2023, McLean announced his retirement from professional soccer.

References

External links
Lachlan McLean at SIUE Athletics

1996 births
Living people
Manly United FC players
SIU Edwardsville Cougars men's soccer players
Chicago FC United players
Greenville Triumph SC players
National Premier Leagues players
USL League One players
USL League Two players
Australian soccer players
Association football forwards
Soccer players from Sydney
Australian expatriate soccer players
Australian expatriate sportspeople in the United States
Expatriate soccer players in the United States
Northern Colorado Hailstorm FC players